Leeds is a town in Androscoggin County, Maine, United States. The population was 2,262 at the 2020 census. It is included in both the Lewiston-Auburn, Maine Metropolitan Statistical Area and the Lewiston-Auburn, Maine Metropolitan New England City and Town Area.

History
Leeds was named after Leeds, England, the ancestral home of the town's first settlers.

Geography

Demographics

As of 2000 the median income for a household in the town was $37,993, and the median income for a family was $42,557. Males had a median income of $30,245 versus $24,250 for females. The per capita income for the town was $15,602.  About 5.9% of families and 9.8% of the population were below the poverty line, including 9.7% of those under age 18 and 9.7% of those age 65 or over.

2010 census
As of the census of 2010, there were 2,326 people, 895 households, and 655 families residing in the town. The racial makeup of the town was 97.5% White, 0.3% African American, 0.5% Native American, 0.2% Asian, 0.3% from other races, and 1.2% from two or more races. Hispanic or Latino of any race were 1.7% of the population.

There were 895 households, of which 32.6% had children under the age of 18 living with them, 58.7% were married couples living together, 8.3% had a female householder with no husband present, 6.3% had a male householder with no wife present, and 26.8% were non-families. 20.8% of all households were made up of individuals, and 7.9% had someone living alone who was 65 years of age or older. The average household size was 2.60 and the average family size was 2.96.

The median age in the town was 41.3 years. 22.8% of residents were under the age of 18; 7.7% were between the ages of 18 and 24; 25.4% were from 25 to 44; 33.1% were from 45 to 64; and 10.9% were 65 years of age or older. The gender makeup of the town was 51.3% male and 48.7% female.

Voter registration

Notable people 

 Kenneth M. Curtis, ambassador to Canada, president of Maine Maritime Academy, 68th governor of Maine
 Oliver O. Howard, Civil War era general, headed the Freedmen's Bureau, and Howard University
 Daniel Stanchfield, explorer, businessman, and member of the Minnesota Territorial House of Representatives
 Samuel B. Stanchfield, member of the Wisconsin State Senate and the Wisconsin State Assembly

Tourism

 Monument Hill Leeds  – Elev 669'.  A short, 3/4 mile, hike from base (North Rd.) to a wooded summit – 200' elev gain. Located at the summit, the obelisk is a "Monument to Peace" after the Civil War. Generals Oliver Otis Howard and Charles Henry Howard placed the obelisk in 1895 "on the great hill" where they as children had played with their brother, Reverend Roland Bailey Howard, Secretary of the American Peace Society. It was Rev. Howard's desire, unfulfilled at the time of his death in 1892, to place a monument there to honor the Peace that came at the end of the Civil War.  
Leeds borders the Androscoggin River and  Androscoggin Lake. Running between these two bodies of water, through Leeds, is the Dead River. This small river has the unique ability to run two ways, depending on whether the Androscoggin Lake or River is higher.

References

External links
 
 Map showing Leeds, Maine, ca. 1750 from the Maine Memory Network
Maine Genealogy: Leeds, Androscoggin County, Maine

Towns in Androscoggin County, Maine
Towns in Maine